Glencoe is situated in the Umzinyathi District, District of KwaZulu-Natal, South Africa.

The main economic activity in the area is coal mining while sheep and cattle ranching are also practiced.

History
With coal discovered at Dundee not even 8 km away an efficient way was needed to transport the coal to the factories other than ox wagons. The railway from Durban to Johannesburg reached this point on 4 September 1889. A new village sprung up where a  branch line was built from the Durban-Johannesburg line  to the eastern Transvaal in 1903. The village was renamed Glencoe, after a mountain valley in Lochaber, Scotland, when it became a town in 1934.

Trivia
 General French was periodically stationed here during the Second Boer War.
 Boer President Paul Kruger twice stayed overnight during the Siege of Ladysmith, South Africa. 
 The house of Carl Landman - second in command at the Battle of Blood River can - be found on a farm close to Glencoe.
 Fort Mistake, a fort designed as a communications link between Ladysmith and Newcastle in 1881 and playing a key role in the Anglo-Boer War is found nearby.

References

Populated places in the Endumeni Local Municipality
Mining communities in South Africa